Weibel Scientific is a Danish engineering company that has specialised in the design and manufacture of doppler radar systems.

It has been in operation since 1936, originally being named M. P. Weibel and having worked as an electronics business throughout the firm's existence. Since the 1970s, the company has focused on becoming a specialised in the field of radar. Having developed an international presence over its decades of existence, Weibel Scientific’s products have been used by a diverse range of operators and for numerous purposes, including the tracking of space vehicles by NASA, as well as the detection of unmanned aerial vehicles and the guidance component of ground-based air defense systems for various nations' militaries.

History
Weibel Scientific can trace its origins back to the establishment of Danish electronics company M. P. Weibel in 1936. It was originally named after its founder, Marius Peter Weibel, and has been a technology-orientated firm even in its early years. 1977 was a year of significant change for Weibel, as the Weibel family decided to divest themselves of involvement in the business; the firm's general manager, Erik Tingleff Larsen, established the firm as Weibel Scientific during this same year.

During the late 1970s and 1980s, Weibel Scientific progressively wound down its previous primary business activity of manufacturing optical detectors, opting to focus its resources on the development of radar systems. In response to international demands for the company's product, management decided to expand the firm beyond Denmark's borders. Accordingly, in 1989, a new German subsidiary, Weibel GmbH, was established; during 1993, the US-based Weibel Equipment Inc. was founded to explore business opportunities in the North American market.

During 2002, Erik Tingleff Larsen stepped back from Weibel Scientific’s day-to-day management, Peder R. Pedersen having become the firm's CEO and President. Larsen has been the firm's sole shareholder, as well as the chairman of the board, for many years. In terms of its corporate structure, Weibel Scientific is organised as a privately-owned, independently-operated corporation.

For decades, the company has marketed its products for purposes such as missile defense systems, and has sold thousands of radar units in the United States alone. The American space organisation NASA has been a long term customer of Weibel, the firm's radar systems have been used to detect debris coming off the Space Shuttle during its launch phase.

During summer 2015, it was announced that Weibel Scientific has entered into a long term partnership with American defence conglomerate Lockheed Martin. This stated aim of this partnership is to integrate Weibel’s radar technology with Lockheed Martin’s missile defense systems, and to act as a major supplier of missile defense packages throughout the North American and European markets. During December 2017, through this partnership, Weibel Scientific received its largest contract to date from the United States Army; this deal has Lockheed Martin acting as the prime contractor for the production and delivery of three Multi-Frequency Tracking Radars.

In January 2019, Weibel Scientific established an office in Norway to facilitate its strategic move towards the drone detection and ground-based air defense markets. During September 2019, the firm secured a contract to supply a phased-array tracking radar to the Andøya Space Center, Norway.

In November 2019, it was announced that Norwegian defense and technology company Kongsberg Gruppen had signed a major contract with Weibel Scientific to provide their radar systems for the Norwegian Army new mobile ground-based air defense system, which will use elements of Norwegian Advanced Surface to Air Missile System (NASAMS) technology; Pedersen stated that it was "one of the most strategically important contracts we have won in our entire history". The line of XENTA-M radars for short-range air defense was announced in November 2020.

Activities
Weibel Scientific’s headquarters is located in Allerød, Denmark. Just over 170 people have been typically employed at the headquarters.

All of Weibel's radars operate in the X band and function as continuous wave doppler radars. The firm designs and produces several classes of radars, including:
 Muzzle velocity radars or Velocimeters for artillery and guns
 Fixed head Doppler radars (SL-xxxx series)
 Tracking radars (MSL-xxxx series)
 Ranging radars for Optical Platforms
 Multi-Frequency Long Range Tracking radars (MFTR-xxxx series)
 Short-range air defense (XENTA-M series)

References

External links
 Weibel company website

Electronics companies of Denmark
Defense companies of Denmark
Aerospace companies of Denmark
Companies based in Allerød Municipality
Technology companies based in Copenhagen
Danish companies established in 1997